Roberts Memorial Provincial Park is a 14 ha provincial park in British Columbia, Canada, located 15 km south of Nanaimo.

A cairn at the park head states, "Donated by May Vaughan Roberts in loving memory of her husband, O.D. Roberts and daughter, Joan Roberts Morgan. Established May 22, 1980".

External links
BC Parks website page for Roberts Memorial Provincial Park

Regional District of Nanaimo
Provincial parks of British Columbia
1980 establishments in British Columbia
Protected areas established in 1980